Kamyana Mohyla (literally: "stone grave") is an archaeological site in the Molochna River (literally: "Milk river") valley, about a mile from the village of Terpinnia, Zaporizhzhia Oblast, Ukraine. Petroglyphs of Kamyana Mohyla are dated from Upper Paleolithic (Kukrek culture) to Medieval, with Stone Age depictions subjected to most archaeological interest.

The site encompasses a group of isolated blocks of sandstone, up to twelve meters in height, scattered around an area of some 3,000 square meters. As Noghai legend has it, it resulted from a scuffle of two baghaturs who took turns throwing rocks at each other. In truth, the site had its origins in a sandbank of the Tethys Ocean. For a long time it was an island in the Molochna River, which has since been silted up and now flows a short distance to the west. It is thought to represent the only sandstone outcrop in the Azov-Kuban Depression. The shape of this sand hill is similar to that of kurgans that dot the Pontic–Caspian steppe.

Petroglyphs are found only inside the caves and grottoes of Kamyana Mohyla, many of them still filled up with sand. No adequate protection from the elements has been provided to this day. Few traces of ancient human settlement have been discovered in the vicinity, leading many scholars to believe that the hill might have served as a remote sanctuary. Faint traces of red paint remain on parts of the surface. Scholars have been unable to agree whether the petroglyphs date from Mesolithic or Neolithic. The latter dating is more popular, although the presumed depiction of a mammoth in one of the caves seems to favour the former date.

History 

In 1889, the Russian archaeologist Nikolay Veselovsky was called upon to explore the enigmatic site and started excavations the following year. As soon as he concluded that the site was a burial mound, excavations were terminated. There was very little scientific exploration of the site during the first third of the 20th century.

In the 1930s, the site was investigated by a team of scholars from Melitopol under Valentin Danylenko (1913–82). The young archaeologist claimed to have discovered thirty caves with petroglyph inscriptions which he dated from the 20th century BC to the 17th century AD. Danylenko resumed his work on the site after World War II and claimed to have discovered thirteen additional caves with petroglyphs.

The site was designated an archaeological preserve in 1954. The move was intended to prevent the area from being flooded after construction of a water reservoir. During the following decades, the condition of petroglyphs visibly deteriorated.

In 2006, the government of Ukraine nominated the site for inscription on the World Heritage List. On the whole, the Stone Tomb images represent traces of religious exercises of the hunters and cattle-breeders of this steppe zone of southeast Europe from the 20th century BC to the 17th century AD. Some caves are of artificial origin; their cultural strata have been fixed as the Neolithic, Bronze and Early Iron Ages as well as of Middle Ages.

Engravings inside the Bull Grotto (the drawing have sometimes been considered to be a mammoth) at Kamyana Mohyla have been studied in the 21st Century using digital tools.

Gallery

Further reading 
 Рудинський М. Я. Кам’яна Могила (корпус наскельних рисунків), видавництво АН УССР, Київ, 1961.
 Даниленко В. М. Кам’яна Могила, «Наукова Думка», Київ, 1986.
 Михайлов Б. Д. Петроглифы Каменной Могилы в Украине, Запорожье, 1994.
 Кифишин А. Г., Древнее святилище Каменная Могила. Опыт дешифровки протошумерского архива XII-III тысячелетий до н.э., «Аратта», Киев, 2001.

See also
 Ural characters
 Vinča signs

References

External links
 Official site

IUCN Category III
Megalithic monuments in Europe
Upper Paleolithic sites in Europe
Mesolithic Europe
Neolithic Ukraine
Archaeological sites in Ukraine
Historic sites in Ukraine
Protected areas of Ukraine
Populated places established in the 2nd millennium BC
Rock art in Europe
Geography of Zaporizhzhia Oblast
Landmarks in Zaporizhzhia Oblast
History of Zaporizhzhia Oblast
Tourist attractions in Zaporizhzhia Oblast
Protected areas of the Pontic–Caspian steppe
Protected areas established in 1954
Prehistoric art